Erupa similis is a moth in the family Crambidae. It was described by Herbert Druce in 1899. It is found in Panama.

References

Erupini
Moths described in 1899